Salim Hemed Khamis (20 September 1951 – 28 March 2013) was a Tanzanian CUF politician and Member of Parliament for Chambani constituency since 2010.

References

1951 births
2013 deaths
Civic United Front MPs
Tanzanian MPs 2010–2015
Fidel Castro Secondary School alumni
Zanzibari politicians